Stath Lets Flats is a British sitcom created and co-written by Jamie Demetriou, which premiered on Channel 4 on 27 June 2018. The series stars Demetriou as an incompetent and socially inept British Greek-Cypriot man who only has his job at a letting agent in London because his father is the owner of the company.

The show also stars Demetriou's sister Natasia Demetriou as Stath's sister Sophie, Christos Stergioglou as his father and boss Vasos, Katy Wix and Kiell Smith-Bynoe as his co-workers Carole and Dean, Ellie White as Sophie's friend Katia, and Al Roberts as Stath's co-worker and only friend Al. Alex Beckett also had an early role as Marcus, and the show was dedicated to him following his suicide between the show's production and broadcast.

Stath Lets Flats has been praised for its writing and performances. In 2020, the show received BAFTA awards for Best Scripted Comedy and Best Male Comedy Performance. The show's third series began broadcasting on 26 October 2021. The show also airs on HBO Max in the US. In January 2022, Demetriou said there were no plans at the time to make a fourth season, but that there may be one in the future.

Cast and characters

Episodes

Series 1 (2018)

Series 2 (2019)

Series 3 (2021)

Reception
Critical reception for series 1 was highly positive. Sam Wollaston of The Guardian gave it a positive review saying that there was "plenty to like". Guy Pewsey of the Evening Standard said that it contained "moments of classic, unmistakably British, humour". Elisa Bray of the i said that it "roared along at speed with energy and absurdity".

The second series won multiple BAFTAs.

Awards and nominations

International adaptation
In December 2020, it was reported that Fox was developing an American adaptation of the series, titled Bren Rents with Joe Mande as writer and executive producer.

References

External links

2018 British television series debuts
2021 British television series endings
2010s British sitcoms
2010s British workplace comedy television series
Channel 4 sitcoms
English-language television shows
Television series about siblings
Television shows set in London
BAFTA winners (television series)